Lake Thomas A Edison (also known as Thomas A. Edison Lake and Edison Lake) is a reservoir in the Sierra National Forest and in Fresno County, California. It is in the Sierra Nevada, and near the Pacific Crest Trail.

The reservoir's waters are impounded by Vermilion Valley Dam (National ID CA00441), which was completed in 1954. The reservoir and dam are part of the Big Creek Hydroelectric Project.

Hydrology
The reservoir discharges into Mono Creek, a tributary of the South Fork San Joaquin River. However, some of its water is diverted to Huntington Lake by means of the Ward Tunnel.

Vermilion Valley Dam

Southern California Edison owns the dam.

Recreation
Located in Sierra National Forest near the Pacific Crest Trail, Lake Thomas A Edison is the centerpiece of Vermilion Valley Resort and Vermillion Campground, which support boating, camping, fishing, swimming, canoeing, kayaking, and horseback riding.

Access
The lake is three hours away by car from Fresno.  Take State Route 168 east to Huntington Lake, head east on Kaiser Pass Road. The road crosses Kaiser Pass (elevation ) and closes during the winter months.  The United States Forest Service does not recommend it for buses, large motor homes, or vehicles towing trailers.

A ferry crosses the lake twice a day (Inactive in 2021 due to extreme low levels of water - travel service to/from the trailhead can be arranged through Vermillion Valley Resort or hikers may follow a trail along the north side of the lake for trail access), linking Vermilion Valley Resort with the John Muir Wilderness trailhead and providing access to and from the John Muir Trail and Pacific Crest Trail.

Nomenclature
The lake was named after American inventor Thomas Edison to mark the 75th anniversary of his invention of the incandescent light bulb.  The dam was named after the valley it flooded, noted for its reddish soil.

See also
 List of dams and reservoirs in California
 List of lakes in California

References

External links
 Lake Thomas A. Edison (Edison Lake)

Edison, Lake Thomas A.
Edison, Lake Thomas A.
Sierra National Forest
Edison, Lake Thomas A.
Edison
Southern California Edison dams